The United States Senate Health Subcommittee on Employment and Workplace Safety is one of the three subcommittees within the Senate Committee on Health, Education, Labor and Pensions.
The Senate Judiciary Subcommittee on Bankruptcy and the Courts is one of seven subcommittees within the Senate Judiciary Committee.

Jurisdiction
Jurisdiction: (1) Federal court jurisdiction, administration and management; (2) Rules of evidence and procedure; (3) Creation of new courts and judgeships; (4) Bankruptcy; (5) Legal reform and liability issues; (6) Local courts in territories and possessions.

Members, 113th Congress

See also
U.S. House Judiciary Subcommittee on Courts, the Internet, and Intellectual Property
U.S. House Judiciary Subcommittee on Commercial and Administrative Law

External links
 Subcommittee on Administrative Oversight and the Courts, official site

Judiciary Senate Administrative Oversight and the Courts